Malic acid is an organic compound with the molecular formula .  It is a dicarboxylic acid that is made by all living organisms, contributes to the sour taste of fruits, and is used as a food additive.  Malic acid has two stereoisomeric forms (L- and D-enantiomers), though only the L-isomer exists naturally.  The salts and esters of malic acid are known as malates. The malate anion is an intermediate in the citric acid cycle.

Etymology
The word 'malic' is derived from Latin 'mālum', meaning 'apple'. The related Latin word , meaning 'apple tree', is used as the name of the genus Malus, which includes all apples and crabapples; and the origin of other taxonomic classifications such as Maloideae, Malinae, and Maleae.

Biochemistry
L-Malic acid is the naturally occurring form, whereas a mixture of L- and D-malic acid is produced synthetically.

Malate plays an important role in biochemistry. In the C4 carbon fixation process, malate is a source of CO2 in the Calvin cycle. In the citric acid cycle, (S)-malate is an intermediate, formed by the addition of an -OH group on the si face of fumarate. It can also be formed from pyruvate via anaplerotic reactions.

Malate is also synthesized by the carboxylation of phosphoenolpyruvate in the guard cells of plant leaves. Malate, as a double anion, often accompanies potassium cations during the uptake of solutes into the guard cells in order to maintain electrical balance in the cell. The accumulation of these solutes within the guard cell decreases the solute potential, allowing water to enter the cell and promote aperture of the stomata.

In food
Malic acid was first isolated from apple juice by Carl Wilhelm Scheele in 1785. Antoine Lavoisier in 1787 proposed the name acide malique, which is derived from the Latin word for apple, mālum—as is its genus name Malus.
In German it is named Äpfelsäure (or Apfelsäure) after plural or singular of a sour thing from the apple fruit, but the salt(s) are called Malat(e).
Malic acid is the main acid in many fruits, including apricots, blackberries, blueberries, cherries, grapes, mirabelles, peaches, pears, plums, and quince and is present in lower concentrations in other fruits, such as citrus. It contributes to the sourness of unripe apples. Sour apples contain high proportions of the acid. It is present in grapes and in most wines with concentrations sometimes as high as 5 g/L. It confers a tart taste to wine; the amount decreases with increasing fruit ripeness. The taste of malic acid is very clear and pure in rhubarb, a plant for which it is the primary flavor. It is also the compound responsible for the tart flavor of sumac spice. It is also a component of some artificial vinegar flavors, such as "salt and vinegar" flavored potato chips.

In citrus, fruits produced in organic farming contain higher levels of malic acid than fruits produced in conventional agriculture.

The process of malolactic fermentation converts malic acid to much milder lactic acid. Malic acid occurs naturally in all fruits and many vegetables, and is generated in fruit metabolism.

Malic acid, when added to food products, is denoted by E number E296. It is sometimes used with or in place of the less sour citric acid in sour sweets. These sweets are sometimes labeled with a warning stating that excessive consumption can cause irritation of the mouth. It is approved for use as a food additive in the EU, US and Australia and New Zealand (where it is listed by its INS number 296).

Malic acid contains 10 kJ (2.39 kilocalories) of energy per gram.

Production and main reactions
Racemic malic acid is produced industrially by the double hydration of maleic anhydride. In 2000, American production capacity was 5,000 tons per year. The enantiomers may be separated by chiral resolution of the racemic mixture. S-Malic acid is obtained by fermentation of fumaric acid.

Self-condensation of malic acid in the presence of fuming sulfuric acid gives the pyrone coumalic acid:

Note that this scheme is incorrect. 4 H2O and 2 CO (carbon monoxide, not carbon dioxide) are liberated during the condensation.

Malic acid was important in the discovery of the Walden inversion and the Walden cycle, in which (−)-malic acid first is converted into (+)-chlorosuccinic acid by action of phosphorus pentachloride. Wet silver oxide then converts the chlorine compound to (+)-malic acid, which then reacts with PCl5 to the (−)-chlorosuccinic acid. The cycle is completed when silver oxide takes this compound back to (−)-malic acid.

Uses
-malic acid is used to resolve α-phenylethylamine, a versatile resolving agent in its own right.

Plant defense
Soil supplementation with molasses increases microbial synthesis of MA. This is thought to occur naturally as part of soil microbe suppression of disease, so soil amendment with molasses can be used as a crop treatment in horticulture.

Interactive pathway map

See also
 Acids in wine
 Citrate malate shuttle
 Crassulacean acid metabolism
 Malate-aspartate shuttle
 Maleic acid, resulting from malic acid dehydration

References

External links
 Malic acid MS Spectrum
Calculator: Water and solute activities in aqueous malic acid

Cellular respiration
Citric acid cycle compounds
Cosmetics chemicals
Dicarboxylic acids
Food acidity regulators
Alpha hydroxy acids
Acids in wine
Chelating agents
E-number additives